Shoorcha rebellion (Akram rebellion, 1842) — uprising against feudal relations Mari, Tatar, Chuvash peasants to protect their property rights in the 19th century.

History 
This rebellion was the result of forced administration on social tillage plots of land allotment. This was a clear diminution of the rights of non-Russian peasants. The uprising swept Kozmodemyansk, Sviazhsk, Spassk, Tsivilsk, Cheboksary, Yadrin uyezds of Kazan Governorate and Buinsky Uyezd of Simbirsk Governorate. Attended by 12 thousand people. During the uprising, there were clashes with government troops near the village Mognyal and Akram of Kazan Governorate. It was brutally suppressed.

Memory 
Writer Hveder Uyar described Akram uprising in his novel "Teneta"

Painter AM Tagaev-Surban depicted in his work Akram uprising.

References

External links 	
 Памятник участникам Акрамовского восстания.
 Шурча вăрçине хутшăннă паттăрсене асăнчĕç

1842 in the Russian Empire
Rebellions in Russia
Conflicts in 1842
19th-century rebellions
Kazan Governorate
Simbirsk Governorate